Nai is the name of a Greek album by singer Anna Vissi.  It is her third studio album and includes the soundtrack of the TV series Methismeni Politeia.  It was released in Greece and Cyprus in 1980 by EMI Greece. In 2006, a remastered version was released, including the Greek participation song in the  ESC 1980 "Autostop", featuring the Epikouri band, as well as two remixes of the song "Oso Eho Foni". The album reached gold status.

Background and release 
After the success coming from her 1979 album Kitrino Galazio, Vissi remained on pop tunes with this album. "Methismeni Politia" was the theme song for a popular drama series during the 1980–1981 TV season on ERT, months before the release of the album and the song subsequently became the first single. The next singles "Oso Eho Foni" and "To Ksero Tha Ertheis Ksana" (a cover of "Woman In Love") were also popular, with "Oso Eho Foni" becoming one of her most enduring classics.

Like Kitrino Galazio, Nai was released on CD in 1987 and was shipped to stores throughout the years as the album continued to sell.

"Oso Eho Foni" alongside "Aftos Pou Perimeno" from Kitrino Galazio were remixed and released on the maxi single The Remixes, in 1997 with much success.

In 2006, prompted by Vissi's entry in Eurovision Song Contest 2006, EMI released a remastered edition of the album adding the 1980 entry in Eurovision Song Contest "Autostop" and two remixes of "Oso Eho Foni".

All songs from the album were included in 2007 Anna Vissi box set Back to Time (Complete EMI Years) which charted on the Greek Albums Chart.

Track listing 

Original version
 "Oso Eho Foni" (As long as I have a voice)
 "To Ksero Tha Erthis Ksana" ("Woman In Love") (I know you'll be back)
 "Den Eimai Monahi" (I'm not alone)
 "Kles Esi Ke Pono" ("Je Reviens De Chercher") (You cry and I feel pain)
 "Magapouses Kapou Kapou" (You loved me every now and then)
 "Gia Afto Sou Leo Mi" (That's why I tell you no)
 "Ti Me Rotas" (Why are you asking me?)
 "Milise Mou" (Talk to me)
 "Na I Zoi" (There is life)
 "Ma Den Fovame" (But I'm not afraid)
 "Kegete O Kosmos Kegete" (World is burning up)
 "Xanazo" (I live again)
 "Methismeni Politia" (Drunk state)

2006 Remastered Version
 "Oso Eho Foni"
 "To Ksero Tha Erthis Ksana" ("Woman In Love")
 "Den Eimai Monahi"
 "Kles Esi Kai Pono" ("Je Reviens De Chercher")
 "Magapouses Kapou Kapou"
 "Gia Afto Sou Leo Mi"
 "Ti Me Rotas"
 "Milise Mou"
 "Na I Zoi"
 "Ma Den Fovame"
 "Kegete O Kosmos Kegete"
 "Ksanazo"
 "Methismeni Politia"
 "Autostop" (ESC 1980 Greek entry)
 "Oso Eho Foni (Club Mix)"
 "Oso Eho Foni (Revival Mix)"

Music 
Music and lyrics are by Filipos Nikolaou, Spiros Vlassopoulos, Yorgos Kannelopoulos, M. Mikelis and D. Iatropoulos.

Personnel 
Credits adapted from the album's liner notes.

Gilbert François Becaud – music
P. Delanoe – music
Dimitris Iatropoulos – lyrics
Barry Gibb – music
Robin Gibb – music
Giorgos Kanelopoulos – lyrics
Αlice Maywood – music
Manolis Mikelis – music
Philippos Nikolaou – music, lyrics
Anna Vissi – vocals
Spiros Vlassopoulos – music

Production
Kostas Fasolas – production management, recording engineering at Studio ERA
Nikos Lavranos – arrangements, instrumentation, orchestral conduction
Haris Andreadis – arrangements, instrumentation, orchestral conduction

Design
Christos Christodoulidis – photos
Dimitris Arvanitis – cover design

References 

Anna Vissi albums
1980 albums
Greek-language albums
Minos EMI albums